Joseph Francis Gilbert (1792 – 25 September 1855) was a British landscape painter and draughtsman.

Biography 

Joseph Francis Gilbert was born in 1792 to Edward Gilbert.

Gilbert was known for painting landscapes and scenery in Sussex, England. He resided in Chichester for several years and painted a number of scenes at Goodwood Racecourse.

A painting by Gilbert is displayed in the tapestry bedroom at Uppark House, it depicts the view of the village of South Harting from the house.

Gilbert died on 25 September 1855, at 17 Hoptons Almshouses, Green Walk in Southwark, London.

References

External links 

 Joseph Francis Gilbert at Google Arts & Culture
 Joseph Francis Gilbert at the British Museum

1792 births
1855 deaths
19th-century British painters
British draughtsmen